Henry Charnock  (25 December 1920 – 28 November 1997) was a British meteorologist.
He is well known for his work on surface roughness and wind stress over water surfaces. The now named "Charnock's relationship" describes the aerodynamic roughness length, over a water surface by:

Charnock was President of the International Union of Geodesy and Geophysics (IUGG) from 1971 to 1975.

References

Bibliography
 'CHARNOCK, Henry’, Who Was Who, A & C Black, 1920–2008; online edn, Oxford University Press, Dec 2007

1920 births
1997 deaths
Commanders of the Order of the British Empire
Fellows of the Royal Society
Presidents of the Royal Meteorological Society
Presidents of the International Union of Geodesy and Geophysics